Characodoma is a genus of bryozoans. Some species are known in the fossil record.

See also 
 List of prehistoric bryozoan genera

References 

 Characodoma at WoRMS
 Characodoma at bryozoa.net

Cheilostomatida
Bryozoan genera